Sirens of the Caribbean, originally released as Bad Girl Island, is a 2007 film directed by Stewart Raffill and starring AnnaLynne McCord and Ashley Anderson.

Cast
AnnaLynne McCord as Debbie Wilks
Antonio Sabato Jr. as Michael  
James Brolin as Terry Bamba

References

External links
 

2007 films
Films directed by Stewart Raffill
2000s English-language films